The , also called the Toyota Rukus in Australia, and the Scion xB in the US and Canada, is a compact 5-door hatchback produced by Toyota from 2007 to 2015. Based on the E150 series Corolla, the design of the car had been adapted from the xB to meet the Japanese preferences. It is also the first Japanese domestic market Corolla model to exceed the Japanese compact car's  width limit, by having .

The "Rumion" nameplate was revived in October 2021 for the rebadged second-generation Suzuki Ertiga marketed in various African countries.

Specifications

Body styles

Engines

Transmissions

Limited editions and packages

Aerotourer Chocolate
The Toyota Corolla Rumion Aerotourer Chocolate is a limited edition of 1.5X, 1.5G, 1.8S with chocolate-colored body. The Corolla Rumion Aerotourer Chocolate edition went on sale on 21 January 2008.

Aerotourer Sora
The Toyota Corolla Rumion Aerotourer Sora is a limited edition of 1.5G Aero Tourer, 1.8S Aero Tourer with Light Blue Mica Metallic body, Super White II-colored aero parts (front spoiler, side mudguard, rear bumpers, rear roof spoiler), two-tone interior (Light Blue Mica Metallic with Super White II meter borders). The Corolla Rumion Aerotourer Sora edition went on sale on 6 May 2008.

1.8S/1.5G “Smart Package”
The 1.8S/1.5G “Smart Package” is an equipment package keyless entry, engine start/stop switch, engine immobilizer. Optional features (standard on 1.8S) include high intensity discharge head lamp, driver side arm rest.

Production
The Toyota Corolla Rumion was built in the Iwate plant of Kanto Auto Works. Toyota stopped exporting the Scion xB to the North American market in 2015 as it was replaced by the iM, which is a rebadged second generation Auris, which was rebranded as the Corolla iM from August 2016 for the 2017 model year since the Scion brand was discontinued.

Gallery

References

External links

 

Rumion
Cars introduced in 2007
2010s cars
Compact cars
Hatchbacks
Front-wheel-drive vehicles
All-wheel-drive vehicles
Vehicles with CVT transmission